Jørn Skaarup (born 13 September 1925) is a Danish retired badminton player.

Skaarup was born on 13 September 1925. He won the All England Open Badminton Championships, considered the unofficial World Badminton Championships, in men's singles in 1948.

References

1925 births
Possibly living people
Danish male badminton players